Genesee is a town in Waukesha County, Wisconsin, United States. The population was 7,171 at the 2020 census. The unincorporated communities of Bethesda, Genesee, Genesee Depot, and Saylesville are in the town.

Geography
According to the United States Census Bureau, the town has an area of 32.0 square miles (82.9 km2), of which, 31.9 square miles (82.6 km2) of it is land and 0.1 square miles (0.3 km2) of it (0.31%) is water.

Demographics

As of the census of 2000, there were 7,284 people, 2,431 households, and 2,095 families living in the town. The population density was 228.3 people per square mile (88.2/km2). There were 2,481 housing units at an average density of 77.8 per square mile (30.0/km2). The racial makeup of the town was 98.31% White, 0.19% African American, 0.27% Native American, 0.29% Asian, 0.04% Pacific Islander, 0.43% from other races, and 0.47% from two or more races. Hispanic or Latino of any race were 1.78% of the population.

There were 2,431 households, out of which 42.9% had children under the age of 18 living with them, 79.4% were married couples living together, 4.6% had a female householder with no husband present, and 13.8% were non-families. 10.0% of all households were made up of individuals, and 2.8% had someone living alone who was 65 years of age or older. The average household size was 3.00 and the average family size was 3.24.

In the town, the population was spread out, with 29.5% under the age of 18, 6.0% from 18 to 24, 28.8% from 25 to 44, 29.1% from 45 to 64, and 6.5% who were 65 years of age or older. The median age was 39 years. For every 100 females, there were 102.8 males. For every 100 females age 18 and over, there were 102.0 males.

The median income for a household in the town was $78,740, and the median income for a family was $83,842. Males had a median income of $51,084 versus $32,582 for females. The per capita income for the town was $31,028. About 0.7% of families and 0.8% of the population were below the poverty line, including 0.4% of those under age 18 and none of those age 65 or over.

Landmarks
Ten Chimneys, the home of Alfred Lunt and Lynn Fontanne, is located in Genesee.

Notable people

 Evan G. Davies, Wisconsin legislator, was born in the town
 Pitts Ellis, Wisconsin legislator, lived in the town
 William Henry Hardy, Wisconsin legislator, lived in the town
 Phil H. Jones, Wisconsin legislator, was born in the town
 Ray David Owen, scientist and educator, was born in the town

See also
 List of towns in Wisconsin

References

External links

 

Towns in Waukesha County, Wisconsin
Towns in Wisconsin